In human anatomy, the left and right posterior communicating arteries are arteries at the base of the brain that form part of the circle of Willis. Each posterior communicating artery connects the three cerebral arteries of the same side. Anteriorly, it connects to the internal carotid artery (ICA) prior to the terminal bifurcation of the ICA into the anterior cerebral artery and middle cerebral artery.  Posteriorly, it communicates with the posterior cerebral artery.

The brain is supplied with blood by the internal carotid arteries and also by the posterior cerebral arteries; the posterior communicating arteries connects the two systems. This provides redundancies or collaterals in the cerebral circulation so that, if one system is blocked or narrowed, the other can take over.

Development
The development of the posterior cerebral artery (PCA) in the fetal brain occurs relatively late and arises from the fusion of several embryonic vessels near the caudal end of the posterior communicating artery.

The PCA begins as a continuation of the posterior communicating artery in 70-90% of fetuses with the remainder of PCAs having a basilar origin. The fetal carotid origin of the PCA usually regresses as the vertebral and basilar arteries become dominant and it finds a new origin in the basilar artery. About 20% of adults retain PCA origin from the posterior communicating artery, and in turn, the internal carotid arteries.

Clinical significance
Aneurysms of the posterior communicating artery are the third most common circle of Willis aneurysm (the most common are anterior communicating artery aneurysms) and can lead to oculomotor nerve palsy.

References

External links
 
 
 
 
 

Arteries of the head and neck